E164 may refer to:
 E164, the E number for saffron
 E.164, an international public telecommunication numbering plan